Spacecom, or Space Communication, is an Israeli communications satellite operator in the Middle East, European Union and North America headquartered in the city of Ramat Gan, Israel. Spacecom operates two satellites at orbital position 4° West – AMOS-3 and AMOS-7, one satellite at orbital position 65° East – AMOS-4, and one satellite at orbital position 17° East – AMOS-5.

History 
Spacecom was established in 1993 with a defined goal of marketing AMOS-1, a newly built communication satellite manufactured by Israel Aerospace Industries (IAI). In 2003, Spacecom launched its second satellite, AMOS-2, owned entirely by the company. In 2008, the AMOS-3 satellite was launched to replace AMOS-1 and to increase coverage and traffic abilities.

Until 2005, Spacecom was a private company controlled by four companies, including IAI and Eurocom Group. It went public on the Tel Aviv Stock Exchange in 2005.

In August 2016, Spacecom shareholders agreed to sell the company for US$500 million to Beijing Xinwei Technology Group (China) via a Luxembourg business entity. The deal, announced 24 August 2016, was pending the successful entry into service of AMOS-6 after the launch. On 1 September 2016, two days before the scheduled launch date, the satellite was destroyed during the run-up to a static fire test of the Falcon 9 launch vehicle. Later statements from both companies stated that negotiations were ongoing, but that the purchase price was likely to be reduced. However, by April 2017 talks between Spacecom and Xinwei had failed, and Spacecom began a new search for buyers. In October 2021 Spacecom and 4iG Plc., a Hungarian information technology and telecommunications company, have signed the agreement in which 4iG is acquiring a majority stake (51%) in Spacecom.

Coverage 
Spacecom satellites provide coverage to most of the Middle East, Europe, Asia and Sub-Saharan Africa.

Services 
 Direct-to-Home broadcasting (DTH)
 Broadband telephony
 Satellite Internet
 VSAT
 Radio

Fleet 

Former
 AMOS-1
 AMOS-2 (4° West)
 AMOS-5 (17° East) – Israeli satellite launched from Kazakhstan in 2011 by Russia's Proton-M launch vehicle to provide services to customers in Africa. AMOS-5 initiated commercial operations in early 2012 with C-band and Ku-band beams. On 21 November 2015, all communications with the AMOS-5 satellite were lost.

In orbit
 AMOS-3 (4° West)
 AMOS-4 (65° East) – was successfully launched on 31 August 2013 from Baikonur, Kazakhstan. It will offer coverage across Southeast Asia along with high power coverage beams offering communication links from East Asia to the Middle East.
 AMOS-7 (4° West) – Lease of AsiaSat 8

See also 
 List of companies of Israel

References

External links 
 Eurocom Group

Communications satellite operators
Telecommunications companies of Israel
Israeli brands